Karel Angèle Antonius Willemen (born May 15, 1967 in Dongen) is a Dutch designer. He is mainly recognized for his contributions to the fantasy-themed amusement park Efteling, located in Kaatsheuvel in the Netherlands.

Willemen started at Efteling in 1988, after completing the Royal Academy for Arts and Design in Den Bosch, as a Senior Modeler, Sculptor and Decorator. In 2001 he moved completely to themes & design, and since 2005 he has been working as a Senior Designer for conceptual experience and theming.

Efteling-portfolio
Fairy Tales
 Fairy Tree
 Cinderella
 animatronic for The Castle of Sleeping Beauty
 model for the animatronic of Tom Thumb
 contributed at Rumpelstiltskin
 contributed at The Chinese Nightingale
 several contributions at The Wishing-Table

Rides:
 Flying Dutchman
 theme for George and the Dragon
 contributed at Dreamflight
 contributed at The People of Laaf
 side entrance and other contributions for PandaVision
 design for new Python trains
 design for new Bob Track trains
 new waiting area and other contributions for Bird Rok

Other creations:
 Forest Realm
 East Station (Station de Oost)

References

1967 births
Living people
Dutch designers
Efteling
People from Dongen
Animatronic engineers